Kampochori may refer to several places in Greece:

Kampochori, Arcadia, a village in Arcadia 
Kampochori, Imathia, a village in the municipal unit of Alexandreia, Imathia 
Kampochori, Kilkis, a village in the municipal unit of Axioupoli, Kilkis regional unit